Zearchaea is a genus of spiders in the Mecysmaucheniidae family. It was first described in 1946 by Wilton. , it contains 2 species from New Zealand.

References

Mecysmaucheniidae
Araneomorphae genera
Spiders of New Zealand